Marlesford is a village and civil parish in the East Suffolk district, in the English county of Suffolk. The population of the civil parish at the 2011 Census was 233.

Location 
It is about 2 miles away from the small town of Wickham Market. Marlesford has a place of worship. The area of the village that is on the A12 road (where the pub was) is due to be by-passed. However the scheme is currently on hold. It once had a railway station called Marlesford railway station but it was closed in 1952.

The station controlled the trains going to Framlingham and the trains were all steam locomotives with 3 level crossings in the village. one at the station, one at the house called the Hedges which Provides access  on to Lime Tree Farm and the third one was at the Gatehouse which has now been converted into a private dwelling. This is also where Marlesford  ford is now situated.

Notable residents
Fitzedward Hall, American Orientalist, and philologist. He was the first American to edit a Sanskrit text, and an early collaborator in the Oxford English Dictionary.
Hamilton Anne Douglas-Hamilton, Rector, Honorary Canon, and first-class cricketer.

References

External links
 Genuki
 
 
 Historical Social Data on Marlesford

Villages in Suffolk
Civil parishes in Suffolk
Suffolk Coastal